Sillanpää (meaning "bridge's end") is a Finnish surname. Notable people with the surname include:

 Miina Sillanpää (1866-1952), Finnish politician, first female Finnish minister
 Rosa Sillanpää (1888–1929), Finnish trade union activist and politician
 Frans Eemil Sillanpää (1888-1964), Finnish writer
 Jari Sillanpää (born 1965), Finnish singer
 Sanna Sillanpää (born 1968), killed three men and wounded another in the Albertinkatu shootings

Finnish-language surnames